Online piracy or software piracy is the practice of downloading and distributing copyrighted works digitally without permission, such as music or software. The principle behind piracy has predated the creation of the Internet, but its online popularity arose alongside the internet. Despite its explicit illegality in many developed countries, online piracy is still widely practiced, due to both the ease with which it can be done, the often defensible ethics behind it, and access to files that would normally cost money. Some of the most pirated software includes Adobe Software and Microsoft Office.

History
One of the earliest recorded acts of unauthorized content copying was when fourteen-year-old Wolfgang Amadeus Mozart visited the Sistine Chapel around 1771 and heard Gregorio Allegri's Miserere being performed. The piece's sheet-music was only authorized to be owned by three people: Leopold I, Holy Roman Emperor, John V of Portugal, and Giovanni Battista Martini. After having heard it for the first time, Mozart went back to his hotel and transcribed the entire piece from memory, coming back again two days later to proofread the transcription against the performance. In the months following his transcription's publication, Mozart's fame for the act had grown to such an extent that Pope Clement XIV summoned him to Rome in order to grant him papal knighthood.

Nathan Fisk traces the origins of modern online piracy back to similar problems posed by the advent of the printing press. Quoting from legal standards in MGM Studios, Inc. v. Grokster, Ltd., he notes that there have historically been a number of technologies which have had a "dual effect" of facilitating legitimate sharing of information, but which also facilitate the ease with which copyright can be violated. He likens online piracy to issues faced in the early 20th century by stationers in England, who tried and failed to prevent the large scale printing and distribution of illicit sheet music.

Starting in the 1980s, the availability of dial-up modems led to the creation of the first warez distribution groups. Internet Relay Chat featured file servers and XDCC prior to numerous methods and still continue to be used.

The release of Napster in 1999 caused a rapid upsurge in online piracy of music, films and television, though it always maintained a focus on music in the .MP3 format. It allowed users to share content via peer-to-peer (P2P) file sharing and was one of the first mainstream uses of this distribution methods as it made it easy for regular users to get free music. Napster's popular use would only be short lived as on July 27, 2000, it was ordered to be shut down by a federal judge; it was officially shut down July 11, 2001 in order to comply with the order and the case was officially settled on September 24, 2001.

Although it was short-lived, Napster's reign allowed its users to dive into the grey area of content piracy. Following its shutdown, many other popular P2P file sharing programs arose: the creation and usage of Limewire quickly followed suit. Learning from the mistakes of Napster, Limewire decentralized their servers by implementing the Gnutella network. The success of the BitTorrent communication protocol led to the rise of many other popular programs that are still widely used today including μTorrent, Transmission, Deluge, qBittorrent, and Tixati.
Digital piracy as a continuing problem significantly impacts various stakeholders, including consumers, enterprises, and countries. This global problem can impact media- and content-oriented industries.

Scope
The economic loss caused by digital piracy before the year 2000 is estimated to be worth $265B and in 2004 it was found that 4% of box office receipts were lost. Both piracy and economic losses due to piracy are both trending upwards. Lost revenues due to digital piracy could reach $5 billion by the end of 2005. Understanding digital privacy can be supplemented by the exploration of the consequences of digital piracy, using a base model and several extensions (with consumer sampling, network effects, and indirect appropriation). According to the IP Commission Report the annual cost of intellectual property theft to the U.S. economy "continues to exceed $225 billion in counterfeit goods, pirated software, and theft of trade secrets and could be as high as $600 billion."
	
A 2019 study sponsored by the U.S. Chamber of Commerce Global Innovation Policy Center (GIPC), in partnership with NERA Economic Consulting "estimates that global online piracy costs the U.S. economy at least $29.2 billion in lost revenue each year." An August 2021 report by the Digital Citizens Alliance states that "online criminals who offer stolen movies, TV shows, games, and live events through websites and apps are reaping $1.34 billion in annual advertising revenues." The DCA claims that they consist of "risky advertising that exposes consumers to fraud and malware."

The groups and individuals who operate piracy websites potentially earn millions of dollars from their efforts. This revenue can come from a number of sources, such as advertising, subscriptions, and the sale of content. Piracy behavior demonstrated that economic theory explains a notable part of the individual variation in a survey study. Individuals with a low net valuation of an original when a copy is available are more prone to engage in piracy than individuals with a higher valuation. Individuals with a low cost of obtaining and handling copies are also more engaged in piracy. The country-wise variation can also be explained by economic variables; GNI/capita and judicial efficiency explain a substantial part of this variation.
While these sites are occasionally shut down, they are often quickly replaced, and may move through successive national legal jurisdictions to avoid law enforcement. These efforts at detection and enforcement are further complicated by the often prohibitive amount of time, resources and personnel required.

Some jurisdictions, such as Thailand and Malaysia, have no legislation in place to address online piracy, and others, such as the Philippines and Vietnam, have oversight regimes in place that have proven largely ineffective.

Benefits
Online piracy has led to improvements into file sharing technology that has bettered information distribution as a whole. Additionally, pirating communities tend to model market trends well, as members of those communities tend to be early adopters. Piracy can also lead to businesses developing new models that better account for the current market. It has been argued that online piracy may help in preventing businesses from investing in unnecessary marketing campaigns. In addition to helping screen businesses, research proposes that some organizations may be better off servicing only their most valued and legitimate customers, or those who buy legitimate copies of their products. Because pirated copies of software are expected to attract customers who are sensitive to price, it may not be to businesses’ best interest to engage in extraneous price wars with their competitors or invest heavily in anti-piracy campaigns to win target customers.

Despite the discourse on the digital threat of piracy, it has been shown that innovation and the creation of new works is flourishing more than ever on the Internet. Piracy has also benefitted users in countries where content is either unavailable or delayed. In the case of ABC's Lost, the fear of its last episode being pirated in European and Middle Eastern countries pushed the network to accelerate the episode's distribution to those countries, resulting in the episode being available in those countries 24–48 hours after the original American broadcast.

Ethics
In many countries the laws on copyright are clear and penalties are heavy. The prevalence of piracy in face of these potential penalties is due to the fact that individuals do not see piracy as inappropriate, let alone illegal, instead viewing it as ethically acceptable due to the core execution of piracy being that it creates a copy of the file; thus nothing tangible is being taken away from the inventor of the work. Additionally, despite the massive realm of copying and sharing digital content, consumers who pirate are more willing to pay for legal content when the content is consumer-friendly. A person's ethical and moral predispositions and the judgments that they use to make decisions may indicate consistency across various ethical dilemmas and also indicate their likelihood to pirate software.

Conversely, those same individuals cited that the prevalence of piracy is due to the industry's inability to cater to the consumer. Many cite unsatisfactory industry practices such as obtrusive DRM in paid software, overpriced media, and split markets as their reason for pirating. Digital piracy has posed a significant threat to the development of the software industry and the growth of the digital media industry, it has, for the last decade, held considerable interest for researchers and practitioners. In the context of Indonesia, moral equity has affected digital piracy behavior negatively. Therefore, efforts to reduce piracy have been focused on highlighting the importance of fairness and justice.
Studying the causes and effects of digital piracy is one way of evaluating the ethics of how our society consumes and spreads media to one another. Ample research in the study of digital piracy can help better understand the psychology and ethics of digital ethics. One of the research approaches that has provided a theoretical framework for studying software piracy has been to place the illegal copying of software within the domain of ethical decision making assumes that a user must be able to recognize software piracy as a moral issue. A person who cannot recognize a moral issue will fail to use moral decision-making schemata. There is evidence that many individuals do not perceive software piracy to be an ethical problem. Research findings suggested that personal morals decrease digital piracy mainly in the first phase, whereas neutralization is used by individuals to support their behavior throughout other phases.

As more content is fractured into different services, consumers gravitate more towards piracy due to the inconvenience and prohibitive cost of managing multiple service subscriptions to different entities that provide their own content service such as Netflix, Hulu, Amazon Prime Video, HBO Max and Disney+.

See also
 Pirated movie release types
 Privacy in file sharing networks
 Trade group efforts against file sharing

References

External links
The Multi-Billion-Dollar Piracy Industry with Tom Galvin of Digital Citizens Alliance, The Illusion of More Podcast

Copyright infringement
File sharing
User-generated content